Laurence "Laurie" Osborne (birth unknown – death unknown) was an English professional rugby league footballer who played in the 1920s.

Playing career

International honours
Laurie Osborne won caps for England while at Hull Kingston Rovers in 1925 against Wales, and in 1927 against Wales.

Challenge Cup Final appearances
Laurie Osborne played , and was captain in the Hull Kingston Rovers' 3–16 defeat by Oldham in the 1924–25 Challenge Cup Final during the 1924–25 season at Headingley Rugby Stadium, Leeds on Saturday 25 April 1925, in front of a crowd of 28,335.

County Cup Final appearances
Laurie Osborne played  and scored 2-goals in the Hull Kingston Rovers' 13–7 victory over Hunslet F.C. in the 1929–30 Yorkshire County Cup Final during the 1929–30 season at Headingley Rugby Stadium, Leeds on Saturday 30 November 1929, in front of a crowd of 11,000.

Note
Laurie Osborne's surname is variously spelt as Osborne, or Osbourne.

References

External links
(archived by web.archive.org) Sad tour for Kiwis

England national rugby league team players
English rugby league players
Hull Kingston Rovers captains
Hull Kingston Rovers players
Place of birth missing
Place of death missing
Rugby league fullbacks
Year of birth missing
Year of death missing